Shelley Lee Hamlin (May 28, 1949 – October 15, 2018) was an American professional golfer who played on the LPGA Tour.

Career
Hamlin was born in San Mateo, California. As an amateur golfer, she won the California Women's Amateur four times. She played at Stanford University and won the 1971 national individual intercollegiate golf championship. She played on the 1968 and 1970 Curtis Cup teams and the 1966 and 1968 Espirito Santo Trophy teams. In 1969, she lost in the finals of the U.S. Women's Amateur to Catherine Lacoste.

Hamlin turned professional in 1972 and joined the LPGA Tour. She won three times on the LPGA Tour between 1978 and 1993.

Hamlin was inducted into the Stanford Athletic Hall of Fame in 1971.

Death
Hamlin died on October 15, 2018, at age 69 from breast cancer.

Amateur wins
1967 California Women's Amateur
1968 California Women's Amateur
1969 California Women's Amateur
1970 California Women's Amateur
1971 AIAW National Collegiate Championship

Professional wins (5)

LPGA Tour wins (3)

LPGA of Japan Tour wins (1)
1975 Japan Classic

Legends Tour wins (1)
2002 Fidelity Investments Classic

U.S. national team appearances
Amateur
Curtis Cup: 1968 (winners), 1970 (winners)
Espirito Santo Trophy: 1966 (winners), 1968 (winners)

References

External links

American female golfers
Stanford Cardinal women's golfers
LPGA Tour golfers
Golfers from California
Golfers from Arizona
People from San Mateo, California
People from Maricopa County, Arizona
Sportspeople from the San Francisco Bay Area
Sportspeople from the Phoenix metropolitan area
Deaths from cancer in Arizona
Deaths from breast cancer
1949 births
2018 deaths